is a town located in Nukata District, Aichi Prefecture, in the Tōkai region of Japan. , the town had an estimated population of  42,200 in 16,198 households, and a population density of 744 persons per km².

Part of the town was called Kōda until 1954. It should not be confused with a district in the nearby city of Tahara, in the same prefecture, also called Koda (Koda-chō)

Geography
Kōta is situated in south-central Aichi Prefecture.

Neighboring municipalities
Aichi Prefecture
Okazaki
Gamagōri
Nishio

Demographics
Per Japanese census data, the population of Kōta has been increasing over the past 70 years.

Climate
The town has a climate characterized by hot and humid summers, and relatively mild winters (Köppen climate classification Cfa).  The average annual temperature in Kōta is 15.5 °C. The average annual rainfall is 1575 mm with September as the wettest month. The temperatures are highest on average in August, at around 27.5 °C, and lowest in January, at around 4.1 °C.

History

Japanese Paleolithic period remains have been found in what is now Kōta, indicating settlement for many thousands of year. Jōmon period and Kofun period remains are plentiful. The area was part of western Mikawa Province under the Ritsuryō system, and organized into shōen under the control of Ise Shrine or the Fujiwara clan in the Heian period. It became a center for the Ikkō-ikki movement in the Sengoku period. Much of the area was under the control of Okazaki Domain under the Edo period Tokugawa shogunate and prospered due to its production of roof tiles, sake, edible oils and its position on the Tōkaidō highway. With the early Meiji period establishment of the modern municipalities system, the area was organized into villages within Nukata District, Aichi Prefecture.  was formed on May 1, 1906 through the merger of three smaller hamlets. It changed the kanji spelling of its name to the present version on July 28, 1909 with the opening of a train station on the Tōkaidō Main Line. The village was elevated to town status on April 1, 1952. On August 1, 1954, the town merged with former Toyosaka village from Hazu District, at which time it changed its transliteration from Kōda to Kōta. A new town hall was completed in 1985.

Economy
Kōta is a center for manufacturing of automotive components and electronics, especially for Toyota and related companies.  One of the more prominent factories in the town is Denso. Sony also has a large R&D and manufacturing complex, Sony Kohda TEC, in Sakazaki district. Agriculture is centered on greenhouse production, with strawberries as a major cash crop.

Education
Kōta has six public elementary schools and three public middle schools operated by the town government, and one public high school operated by the Aichi Prefectural Board of Education.

Transportation

Railway
 Central Japan Railway Company - Tōkaidō Main Line

Highways

Sister city relations
 - Siem Reap, Cambodia

Notable people from Kōta 
Matsudaira Ietada, Sengoku-period daimyō
Natsume Yoshinobu, Sengoku-period samurai

References

External links

  (with link to pages in English)

 
Towns in Aichi Prefecture